Hannu Koskinen (born 23 November 1953) is a Finnish ice hockey player. He competed in the men's tournament at the 1980 Winter Olympics.

References

1953 births
Living people
Finnish ice hockey forwards
Olympic ice hockey players of Finland
Ice hockey players at the 1980 Winter Olympics
Sportspeople from Lahti